Emma Rush is a lecturer in philosophy and ethics at Charles Sturt University Faculty of Arts, School of Humanities and Social Sciences, notable for her work on sexualisation of children.

In 2006, Rush worked on a series of reports for The Australia Institute. Two of the reports which she co-authored led to a senate inquiry into the sexualisation of children.

Rush has also been consulted by the media, including Australia's ABC News and The Sydney Morning Herald.

Research 
Rush's main areas of research are: ethics in public life, particularly, sexualisation of children and the corporatisation of child care; professional ethics, particularly social work ethics, with a developing project on resilience; and environmental ethics.

Media 
Rush has acted as a media consultant over issues relating to sexualisation, advertising and pornography debates by ABC Radio, Australia, ABC News, Australia, The Sydney Morning Herald, The Conversation, and Melinda Tankard Reist's website.

Selected bibliography

Ph.D thesis

2006 papers for The Australia Institute 
2006 discussion papers for the Australia Institute 
  Pdf version. 
  Pdf version.
  Pdf version.
  Pdf version.

2006 web papers for the Australia Institute 
  Pdf version.
  Pdf version.
  Pdf version.

Chapters in books 

 
 
 
 
 
 
 
 
 Rush, E., Short, M., Burningham, G., Cartledge, J. (2020). ‘Philosophy and ethics: Sustaining social inclusion in the disability sector’. In Crisp, B.R. and Taket, A. (Eds.), Sustaining Social Inclusion, Routledge, pp. 203–217. ISBN (electronic) 9780429397936

Journal articles 
 
 
 
 
 
 Strong, C. and Rush, E. (2018) Musical genius and/or nasty piece of work? Dealing with violence and sexual assault in accounts of popular music’s past, Continuum, https://doi.org/10.1080/10304312.2018.1483009.
 Short, M., Dempsey, K., Ackland, J., Rush, E., Heller, E. & Dwyer, H. (2018). What is a person? Deepening students’ and colleagues’ understanding of person-centredness, Advances in Social Work & Welfare Education, vol. 20, no.1, pp. 139–156. ISSN 1329-0584

References

External links
 Profile page: Dr Emma Rush School of Humanities and Social Sciences, Charles Sturt University
 Emma Rush OCLC WorldCat Identities

Anti-pornography activists
Anti-prostitution activists
Date of birth missing (living people)
Feminist philosophers
Living people
Australian philosophers
Place of birth missing (living people)
Academic staff of Charles Sturt University
Year of birth missing (living people)
Environmental ethicists